Pamela Morgan (born November 25, 1957) is a Canadian recording artist, songwriter, and owner of independent label Amber Music, now living in St. John's, Newfoundland and Labrador. From 1976 to 1995 she was lead singer of influential folk rock band Figgy Duff.

Discography
Solo:
2013: Play On
2007: Ancestral Songs
2002: Seven Years
1995: On a Wing and a Prayer
1998: Collection
1997: Amber Christmas (with Anita Best)
1992: The Color of Amber (with Anita Best)

With Figgy Duff:
2008:  Figgy Duff Live
1995:  Retrospective
1993:  Downstream
1989:  Weather Out the Storm
1982:  After the Tempest
1980:  Figgy Duff

External links
 Pamela Morgan Homepage
 Amber Music Homepage
 Pamela Morgan - Encyclopedia of Newfoundland and Labrador, v. 3, p. 618
 Pamela Morgan and Noel Dinn - Heritage Newfoundland and Labrador

Canadian folk singers
Canadian women folk singers
Living people
1957 births
Musicians from St. John's, Newfoundland and Labrador